Senkata is an area in the southern part of El Alto, Bolivia, and is part of the city's 8th District. El Alto is the second most populated city in Bolivia according to the 2012 census.   Senkata has drawn international attention for the social protests of 2003, part of the October Massacre during the Bolivian gas conflict, and the Senkata Massacre, during the post electoral protests in Bolivia in 2019.  In both events, an executive decree authorizing police and military intervention was followed by civilian deaths. In 2003, the intervention was supported by executive Decree 27209, and in 2019 the intervention was supported by Decree 4078, which exempted the Armed Forces of Bolivia of criminal responsibility. Decree 4078 was repealed on the 28th of November 2019 after Jeanine Áñez's government reached an agreement with social organisations.

Location 
Senkata is located in the lateral areas of Avenida 6 de marzo in the city of El Alto, Bolivia. This avenue is part of the  Ruta nacional 1 - the Bolivian highway network that connects the La Paz Department (Bolivia) with the departments of Oruro, Chuquisaca, Potosí and Tarija.

Characteristics 
The District of Senkata is in the vicinity of the La Paz - Oruro highway. It houses the Senkata Plant, where Yacimientos Petrolíferos de Bolivia has its liquid gas and gasoline installations  providing these to the neighbouring city of La Paz,   also houses the headquarters of the executive power of Bolivia.

History 
Much like the other districts in El Alto, the population that lived there initially were immigrants of other regions in Bolivia, mainly miners that lived through the relocation in Bolivia during the 80s, which caused the loss of jobs for mine workers and triggered their migration to other cities.

This migration period represents one of the four milestones that marked the urban development of El Alto, a city with 90% of inhabitants that speak Aymara.

Neighborhoods and residential areas 
The Senkata area shows a big development of District 8, it has many neighbourhoods and residential areas like:

 Florida Senkata
 San Luis de Senkata
 San Jorge Senkata
 5 de diciembre
 Senkata 79 Anex
 San Miguel Senkata
 27 de mayo Senkata
 Los Pinos Senkata
 Florida Senkata
 6 de agosto Senkata
 Senkata 79
 Senkata Pucarani

Landmarks 
Among the main landmarks of the area there are:

 Church San Francisco de Asís
 Square 25 de julio
 Ex-tranca of Senkata
 Parrish of Santa Clara
 Senkata Plant YPFB

References

See also 

 El Alto
 La Paz

La Paz